Jeff Hamilton is the name of:
Jeff Hamilton (1840–1941), enslaved man and free servant of the Houston family. See Sam Houston and slavery § Jeff Hamilton
Jeff Hamilton (drummer) (born 1953), jazz drummer
Jeff Hamilton (baseball) (born 1964), of the Los Angeles Dodgers
Jeff Hamilton (ice hockey) (born 1977), of the Chicago Blackhawks
Jeff Hamilton (basketball), coach for the Shawnee State Bears
Jeff Hamilton (guitarist), backing musician for Violent Femmes

See also
Geoff Hamilton (1936–1996), British gardener